Nongthombam Biren Singh (Meitei pronunciation: /nōng-thōm-bam bī-ren sīng/; born 1 January 1961) is an Indian politician, former footballer and journalist, who is currently serving as the Chief Minister of Manipur for the second term since 2017. He is the first incumbent Chief Minister who serves as the president of the Lainingthou Sanamahi Temple Board (LSTB), the temple development board of Lainingthou Sanamahi of the Sanamahi religion.

N. Biren Singh was awarded Champions of Change in 2018 for his exceptional work to the nation. The award was conferred by the Vice-President of India Sri. Venkaiah Naidu at Vigyan Bhavan New Delhi.

Turning to politics in 2002, Singh joined the Democratic Revolutionary Peoples Party and won the assembly elections from Heingang. He retained the seat in 2007 contesting with an Indian National Congress ticket after joining the party in 2003. Serving as the Minister of Youth Affairs and Sports, he quit the party in 2016 before joining the Bharatiya Janata Party. In 2017, he retained his seat from Heingang again and was named the Chief Minister after his party gained Coalition and formed the government. In 2022 he once again retained his seat from Heingang. He has won the Heingang assembly constituency since 2002. Under Mr. Singh’s leadership that the BJP not only increased its seat share in the Manipur Assembly, from 21 (in 2017) to 32 (in 2022), but had also managed to weather several storms while running a minority government in the last five years.

Early career 

He began his career as a footballer and got recruited in the Border Security Force (BSF) playing for its team in domestic competitions. He resigned from the BSF and turned to journalism. Despite having had no formal training and experience, he began the vernacular daily Naharolgi Thoudang in 1992 and worked as the editor till 2001.

Political career

Democratic Revolutionary Peoples Party 

In 2002, he was elected to the Legislative Assembly of Manipur, as the Democratic Revolutionary Peoples Party (DRPP) candidate in the constituency Heingang.

Indian National Congress 

He later joined the Indian National Congress. He was appointed Minister of State of Vigilance in the Manipur state government in May 2003.

In 2007 he retained his Assembly seat, contesting on behalf of the Indian National Congress. He was later appointed the Minister of Irrigation & Flood Control and Youth Affairs & Sports in the State Government. In 2012 he again retained his Assembly seat for the third consecutive term.

In September 2015, Biren stated that the recently passed bill in the Manipur Legislative Assembly to protect indigenous peoples would not harm any community in the state.

In October 2016, Biren resigned from the Manipur Legislative Assembly and the Manipur Pradesh Congress Committee, this came after revolt against Okram Ibobi Singh, the then Chief Minister of Manipur.

Bharatiya Janata Party 

Singh formally joined the BJP on 17 October 2016 and later became the Spokesperson and Co-convener of the Election Management Committee of BJP Manipur Pradesh. He won the 2017 Manipur Legislative Assembly Election from Heingang Assembly Constituency.

As Chief Minister  

In March 2017, he was elected as leader of the BJP Legislature Party in Manipur and with a majority of MLAs having been presented to the Governor, he was sworn in as Chief Minister of Manipur on 15 March 2017. He is the first-ever BJP Chief Minister in Manipur.

In January 2018, he laid the foundation stone for the new academic building of Manipur Public School. The project is undertaken by Manipur Minorities and OBC Economic Development Society (MOBEDS). The cost of the project is estimated to be Rs 10.80 crore under the Union Ministry of Minority Affairs and will include new classrooms, headmaster's room, common rooms, library, laboratories, toilets, and separate hostels for boys and girls.

On April 20, 2018, Singh launched the First State-Level Ginger Festival at Parbung in Pherzawl District. The festival will remain one of Singh's legacies in the promotion of agriculture in the hill district which is one of the most backward in the state. Farmers have reported that since 2018 they are able to sell their organic ginger throughout the year.

During the 2020 COVID-19 pandemic in India, Manipur became the third State to declare itself coronavirus free after the two patients who had tested positive successfully recovered from the virus.

On 17 June 2020, 9 MLAs supporting the N. Biren Singh led government in Manipur revolted against him and withdrew support from his government blaming him for lack of action during the COVID-19 pandemic. During the vote of confidence, he was one of the eight MLAs who had skipped the assembly proceedings defying the party whip for the trust vote. All members resigned from Indian National Congress and later joined Bharatiya Janata Party in presence of Ram Madhav, Baijayant Panda and Chief Minister of Manipur Biren Singh.

See also 

 N. Biren Singh ministry

References 

Indian National Congress politicians
Meitei poets
Living people
1961 births
People from Imphal East district
Manipur politicians
Manipur MLAs 2017–2022
Bharatiya Janata Party politicians from Manipur
Chief ministers from Bharatiya Janata Party
Manipur MLAs 2012–2017
Manipur MLAs 2007–2012
Manipur MLAs 2002–2007
Manipur MLAs 2022–2027